Rana Ansar is a Pakistani politician who had been a Member of the Provincial Assembly of Sindh, from June 2013 to May 2018.

Early life and education
She was born on 17 August 1966 in Hyderabad, Pakistan.

She has earned the degree of Master of Arts in Islamic Culture from the University of Sindh.

Political career

She was elected to the Provincial Assembly of Sindh as a candidate of Muttahida Qaumi Movement (MQM) on a reserved seat for women in 2013 Pakistani general election.

She was re-elected to the Provincial Assembly of Sindh as a candidate of MQM on a reserved seat for women in 2018 Pakistani general election.

References

Living people
Sindh MPAs 2013–2018
1966 births
Muttahida Qaumi Movement MPAs (Sindh)